Bornella is a genus of sea slugs, specifically dendronotid nudibranchs in the family Bornellidae.

There has not been much research on this genus. Their biology is mostly unknown, except that they seem to feed exclusively on hydroids.

Distribution
These nudibranchs occur in the Indo-West Pacific. In addition there is one species in the tropical eastern Pacific, and one species in the western Atlantic.

Description
Their body is covered with cerata-like dorsal and lateral outgrowths, with finger-like branches. They have an attached cluster of  gills. Their rounded head shows on each side of the mouth a tentacle, with tiny finger-like papillae. The sheath of the rhinophore stands high and resembles the dorsal processes. Feeds on hydroids.

The various species differ in their color pattern and their number of dorsal and lateral outgrowths and the number of branches on their rhinophore sheath.

Anatomy
These nudibranchs are characterized by an unpaired oral gland.

In their genital system, the male duct is separate from the female duct.

Species 
Species within this  genus include:
 Bornella anguilla Johnson, 1984 
 Bornella calcarata Mörch, 1863 
 Bornella dotoides Pola, Rudman & Gosliner, 2009 
 Bornella excepta Bergh, 1884  
 Bornella hermanni Angas, 1864  (synonym : Bornella. japonica  Baba, 1949 )
 Bornella irvingi Edmunds and Preece, 1996 
 Bornella johnsonorum Pola, Rudman & Gosliner, 2009 
 Bornella pele Pola, Rudman & Gosliner, 2009
 Bornella sarape Bertsch, 1980.
 Bornella simplex Eliot, 1904 
 Bornella stellifer  (Adams and Reeve in Adams, 1848)  (synonyms : Bornella  hancockana  Kelaart, 1859 , Bornella  arborescens  Pease, 1871 ,  Bornella caledonica  Crosse, 1875 , Bornella  marmorata  Collingwood, 1881 )
 Bornella valdae Pola, Rudman & Gosliner, 2009
Invalid species names include:
 B. semperi Crosse 1875 (nomen nudum)

References 

Gastropod genera
Bornellidae
Taxa named by John Edward Gray